The 1999 FIA GT Championship was the third season of FIA GT Championship, an auto racing series endorsed by the Fédération Internationale de l'Automobile (FIA) and organized by the Stéphane Ratel Organisation (SRO).  The races featured grand touring cars and awarded a drivers and teams championship.  The season began on 11 April 1999 and ended 26 November 1999 after ten races in Europe, the United States, and China.

Following the domination of Mercedes-Benz the previous two seasons, pre-season entries for the GT1 category were so few that the FIA and SRO chose to eliminate the class for 1999.  The former GT2 class became the sole category of cars eligible for the championships, although cars from national championships were allowed to participate on an invitational basis at some events. Chrysler Viper Team Oreca dominated the championship for the entire season, winning all but one race en route to the Teams title. Olivier Beretta won his second-consecutive championship, sharing the Drivers title with teammate Karl Wendlinger, earning six of Oreca's nine race victories.

Schedule
For the first time in the history of both the FIA GT Championship and its predecessor series, the BPR Global GT Endurance Championship, a  endurance race was not part of the season as the 1000 km Suzuka was dropped from the schedule, instead all races were held to a  distance. The Japanese event was replaced by a race at the Zhuhai International Circuit, which the BPR series had visited in 1996. Dijon-Prenois was also not retained from 1998, replaced by the Zolder and Monza, which started the season.  The series initially planned to retain the A1-Ring before the event was replaced by a second American event at Watkins Glen.  The two American rounds were intended to be run in conjunction with the United States Road Racing Championship before the series was canceled in the summer of 1999, although American teams were invited to participate as non-scoring entries.

Entries

Results and standings

Race results

Points were awarded to the top six finishers in each race. Entries were required to complete 75% of the race distance in order to be classified as a finisher. Drivers were required to complete 20% of the total race distance for their car to earn points. Teams scored points for each of its cars which finished a race in a top six placing.

Drivers championship

Teams championship

References

External links
 1999 FIA Championship Classifications, www.fia.com, as archived at web.archive.org
 1999 FIA GT Championship points charts, www.fiagt.com, as archived at web.archive.org
 FIA GT Championship 1999, www.wsrp.cz
 FIA GT Championship, www.racingsportscars.com

FIA GT Championship
FIA GT Championship seasons